= C. T. Cockburn =

American state legislator (1858–1914)

Member of the Arkansas House of Representatives
- In office 1911–1914

Personal details
- Born: Clark T. Cockburn; August 4, 1858
- Died: December 7, 1914 (aged 56)
- Occupation: Politician

Clark T. Cockburn (August 4, 1858 – December 7, 1914) was an American state legislator in Arkansas from 1911 until 1914. He opposed a bill to make it a felony for women to use men's bathrooms.
